Bonifaty Mikhailovich Kedrov (Yaroslavl – 10 September 1985, Moscow) was a Soviet researcher, philosopher, logician, chemist and psychologist who was a specialist in the philosophy of dialectical materialism.

Son of the Bolshevik leader Mikhail Kedrov, he himself joined the Bolsheviks in 1918.

Kedrov had a Doctor of Philosophy degree and specialized in philosophical questions of the natural sciences. He was a member of the Academy of Sciences of the Soviet Union since 1966, author of over one thousand publications.

Since 1963, Kedrov was a member of the International Academy of the History of Science and a number of other institutions. Kedrov was one of the initiators and the first editor-in-chief of Problems of philosophy (Voprosy filosofii), a leading Soviet journal of philosophy, from 1947 to 1949.

Publications
 ΄΄The Science'' (1968) in association with Alexander Spirkin

References

1903 births
1985 deaths
20th-century Russian chemists
20th-century Russian philosophers
People from Yaroslavl
Communist Party of the Soviet Union members
Corresponding Members of the USSR Academy of Pedagogical Sciences
Foreign Members of the Bulgarian Academy of Sciences
Full Members of the USSR Academy of Sciences
Members of the German Academy of Sciences Leopoldina
Moscow State University alumni
Recipients of the Order of Lenin
Recipients of the Order of the Red Banner of Labour
Recipients of the Order of the Red Star
Bolsheviks
Historians of science
Philosophers of science
Russian chemists
Russian logicians
Russian philosophers
Russian psychologists
Russian revolutionaries
Soviet chemists
Soviet logicians
Soviet philosophers
Soviet psychologists
Burials at Novodevichy Cemetery
Foreign members of the Serbian Academy of Sciences and Arts